Al-Zubayr, Al-Zubair, Az-Zubayr or Az-Zubair may refer to:

People

Zubayr ibn al-Awwam (594–656), Arab military commander of the Rashidun Caliphate and cousin of Muhammad
al-Zubayr ibn Abd al-Muttalib, founder of the Hilf al-Fudul and an uncle of Muhammad
Abd Allah ibn al-Zubayr (624–692) was an Arab military commander and the leader of a rebellion against the Umayyad Caliphate
Urwah ibn Zubayr (died 713), Muslim historian and one of The Seven Fuqaha of Medina
al-Zubayr ibn Bakkar (788–870), Arab historian and genealogist
Aḥmad ibn al-Zubayr (fl. 1052–1071), Egyptian historian
al-Zubayr Rahma Mansur (1830–?), Sudanese slave trader and a pasha of Bahr el Ghazal under the Khedivate of Egypt
Rabih az-Zubayr (c. 1842–1900), Sudanese warlord and slave trader
Ahmed al-Zubair al-Senussi (born 1934), Libyan politician and prince of the Senussi house 
Zubair Mohamed Salih (1944–1998), former Sudanese Vice President and soldier
Nabila al-Zubayr (born 1964), Yemeni poet and novelist

Places
Al-Zubair District, a district in Basra Governorate, Iraq
Az Zubayr, the capital of Al-Zubair District
Khor Al Zubair, a city in Basra Governorate, Iraq
Khor Al Zubair Port, the port of Khor Al Zubair
The Khawr Al-Zubayr channel between Kuwait and Iraq
Deim Zubeir, a town in Lol State, South Sudan
Zubair Group, a group of volcanic islands belonging to Yemen
Bait Al Zubair, a museum in Muscat, Oman
Bani Az Zubayr, a village in Sana'a Governorate, Yemen
Az Zubair Field, an oil field in southern Iraq

Other uses
Al-Zubair SC, an Iraqi football club
Al-Zubair I, a Sudanese main battle tank based on the Type 59
Al-Zubair II, a Sudanese main battle tank based on the Type 59D

See also
Zubayr (disambiguation)
Zubayr (name)
Al-Zubara